The River Inny (Irish: Abhainn na hUíne) is a river in County Kerry, Ireland.

References

Rivers of County Kerry